Soundaryan is an Indian music composer. A former ad-jingles composer, he made his debut in the Tamil film Cheran Pandiyan (1991) and then made a breakthrough with his work in Sindhu Nathi Poo (1994).

Career
Soundaryan began his career by working with K. S. Ravikumar on two successful films, Cheran Pandiyan (1991) and Putham Pudhu Payanam (1991). He subsequently composed songs for films with rural backdrops in the 1990s, winning acclaim for his work in Sindhu Nathi Poo (1994), Gopura Deepam (1997) and Cheran Chozhan Pandian (1998), before working on low budget films thereafter.

Throughout the 2000s and 2010s, he has continued to work as a music composer, and recently worked on Nadhigal Nanaivadhillai (2014) and Nanaiyadha Mazhaiye (2016).

Discography

As composer

Cheran Pandiyan (1991)
Putham Pudhu Payanam (1991)
Mudhal Seethanam (1992)
Sindhu Nathi Poo (1994)
Muthukulikka Vaariyala (1995)
Maamanithan (1995)
Andha Naal (1996)
Take It Easy Urvashi (1996)
Gopura Deepam (1997)
Conductor Mappillai (1997)
Ponmaanai Thedi (1998)
Cheran Chozhan Pandian (1998)
Seerivarum Kaalai (2001)
Nearupoo (2001)
Anbu Thollai (2003)
Galatta Ganapathy (2003)
Kadhale Jayam (2004)
Mudhal Aasai (2005)
Veeranna (2005)
Malarinum Melliya (2008)
Nadhigal Nanaivadhillai (2014)
Nanaiyadha Mazhaiye (2016)
Puthiya Bruce Lee (2018)
Pasakara Paya (2022)

As lyricist
Putham Puthu Payanam - all songs
Cheran Pandian - all songs

References

Tamil musicians
Tamil film score composers
Living people
Year of birth missing (living people)
Indian film score composers